Nannostomus digrammus, (from the Greek: nanos = small, and the Latin stomus = relating to the mouth; from the Latin: digrammus = two lines), commonly known as the twostripe pencilfish, is a freshwater species of fish belonging to the characin family Lebiasinidae. They were first described in 1913  by Henry Weed Fowler and are fairly typical of members of this genus being small, elongated fish with prominent horizontal stripes, in this case limited to two dominant stripes, usually maroon in color. They are recorded as native to Brazil and Guyana, where they occur fairly widely, but are seen only occasionally in the aquarium trade.

References

Lebiasinidae
Taxa named by Henry Weed Fowler
Fish described in 1913
Fish of South America
Fish of the Amazon basin